Kitcliffe Reservoir is a reservoir in Piethorne Valley in between Ogden and Piethorne Reservoirs in the Metropolitan Borough of Rochdale, within Greater Manchester, England.

References

Tourist attractions in the Metropolitan Borough of Rochdale
Reservoirs in Greater Manchester